The Railway Regulation Act 1844 was an Act of the Parliament of the United Kingdom providing a minimum standard for rail passenger travel. It provided compulsory services at a price affordable to poorer people to enable them to travel to find work. It is one of the Railway Regulation Acts 1840 to 1893.

The prior situation
Until that time there were three or more classes of carriage, third class usually an open goods wagon, often without seats, sometimes referred to sarcastically as "Stanhopes", a corruption of "Stand-ups". During that year, a select committee had produced six reports on the railways, at the behest of the Board of Trade under its president, W. E. Gladstone. These led to An Act to attach certain Conditions to the construction of future Railways authorised by any Act of the present or succeeding sessions of Parliament; and for other Purposes in relation to Railways, referred to as "Gladstone's Act".

The original bill introduced into Parliament by W. E. Gladstone had been far-reaching for its time - even proposing state ownership of the railways and telegraph.

Contents
The Act stated:

 One train with provision for carrying third-class passengers, should run on every line, every week day, in each direction, stopping at every station. (These are what were originally known as "parliamentary trains.")
 The fare should be 1d. per mile.
 Third-class passengers should be protected from the weather and be provided with seats.

In return the railway operator was exempted from duty on third class passengers. The price was not cheap for working people. An additional requirement was that they should be allowed to carry  of luggage free. It helped those in search of work thus, as Smith  points out, its benefit was to improve labour supply.

Rail company reaction
The reaction of many railway companies was grudging acceptance of the letter, if not the spirit of the legislation, and they provided the minimum one train per day with facilities for third class passengers at an unpopular time such as early morning or late at night.  These were the original parliamentary trains. The reason for the reluctance was to avoid losing revenue if passengers who could afford to travel second class switched to third if facilities there became bearable. Some companies continued to run inferior third or fourth class trains in addition to the minimum standard parliamentary train.

The Midland Railway broke ranks by providing three compartments, with glazed windows and an oil lamp in the roof, causing resentment among competitors. Finally in 1875 the standard of third class was upgraded and second class was abolished – by relabelling the coaches. It caused scandal now difficult to imagine. In the 1800s there was rigid distinction between social classes and the belief was that the railway would bring "the 'lower orders' nearer to equality with their 'betters' "  Sir James Allport, general manager of the Midland Railway, in a speech said:

Other railways followed, and because they were obliged to provide third class, the oddity of first and third, but no second – except on boat trains – persisted into the 20th century, when third class was rebranded to second class in 1956, and then further rebranded as 'standard' to remove negative associations.

See also 
 Cheap Trains Act 1883

References

Bibliography

External links
Railways Archive: An Act to attach certain Conditions to the Construction of future Railways 1844

History of rail transport in the United Kingdom
United Kingdom Acts of Parliament 1844
Railway Acts
1844 in rail transport
Transport policy in the United Kingdom